King of the Hill is an American animated sitcom created by Mike Judge and Greg Daniels for the Fox Broadcasting Company. The series initially aired from January 12, 1997, to May 6, 2010, and centers on the Hills, an American family in the fictional city of Arlen, Texas, as well as their neighbors, co-workers, relatives, classmates, friends, and acquaintances. Series protagonist, patriarch, and everyman Hank Hill works as assistant manager at Strickland Propane. He lives in a ranch-style house with his wife Peggy, his son Bobby, his niece Luanne, and his pet bloodhound Lady Bird. Hank's neighbors are his longtime friends Bill Dauterive, a divorced, bald, overweight military barber and former high school football star; Dale Gribble, a paranoid, pro-gun, anti-government pest exterminator; and Jeff Boomhauer, a charismatic, soft-spoken, often unintelligible bachelor. The show's realistic approach seeks humor in the conventional and mundane aspects of everyday life, such as blue-collar workers, substitute teachers, the trials of puberty, and political correctness.

Judge began creating King of the Hill during his time making the MTV series Beavis and Butt-Head, which he also created and voiced in. After pitching the pilot to Fox, Judge was paired with Greg Daniels, an experienced writer who previously worked on The Simpsons. The series debuted on the Fox network as a mid-season replacement in 1997, quickly becoming a success. The series' popularity led to worldwide syndication, and cable reruns currently air on FXX and Cartoon Network's late night programming block, Adult Swim, having aired on CMT, FX and Comedy Central in the past. The show became one of Fox's longest-running series. A total of 259 episodes aired over the course of its 13 seasons. The final episode aired on Fox on September 13, 2009. Four episodes from the final season were planned to air on Fox, but later premiered in nightly syndication from May 3 to 6, 2010.

King of the Hill was named by Time magazine in its 2007 list of "The 100 Greatest TV Shows of All Time". The series has won two Emmy Awards and has been nominated for seven. Its celebrity guest stars include Chuck Mangione (playing a fictionalized version of himself), Tom Petty (playing the recurring character Lucky), Alan Rickman (playing a king at a Renaissance fair), and numerous country music artists. On January 18, 2022, Judge and Daniels announced the forming of a new company called Bandera Entertainment, with a revival of King of the Hill being one of several series in development. In September 2022, it was announced that the revival had not been picked up by Fox. On January 31, 2023, it was announced that Hulu picked up the revival.

Series synopsis

King of the Hill is set in the fictional small town of Arlen, Texas. The show centers on the Hill family, headed by the ever-responsible, calm, hard-working, loyal, disciplined, and honest propane and propane accessory salesman Hank Hill (voiced by Mike Judge). The punning title refers to Hank as the head of the family as well as metaphorically to the children's game King of the Hill. Hank is employed as the assistant manager at Strickland Propane, selling "propane and propane accessories", a frequent catchphrase. He often finds his traditional conservative values challenged by the changing world around him, though his common decency always sees him through. Hank typically serves as the de facto leader for his friends and family. His wife Peggy Hill (née Platter) (voiced by Kathy Najimy), a native of Montana, is a substitute Spanish teacher, though she has a poor grasp of the language. Peggy also finds employment and avocation as a freelance newspaper columnist for The Arlen Bystander as well as a Boggle champion, a notary public, a softball pitcher, and a real estate agent. She is confident, frequently to the point of lacking self-awareness. Hank and Peggy's only child, Bobby Hill (voiced by Pamela Adlon), is a student at Tom Landry Middle School. His characteristic lack of athleticism and interests in prop comedy and cooking are mystifying to his more conventional father but are encouraged by his mother.

Throughout the series, Peggy's naïve and emotional niece Luanne Platter (voiced by Brittany Murphy), the daughter of Peggy's scheming brother Hoyt (voiced by Johnny Knoxville) and his alcoholic ex-wife, Leanne (voiced by Adlon), lives with the Hill family. Hank originally encourages her to move out, but over time accepts her as a member of the household. Luanne attends beauty school and hosts a Christian-themed puppet show for a local cable access TV station. Luanne later engages in a relationship and later marries Elroy "Lucky" Kleinschmidt (voiced by Tom Petty), a snaggle-toothed layabout who lives on the settlements he has earned from a frivolous lawsuit.

Hank has a healthy relationship with his mother, Tilly (voiced by Tammy Wynette, later by Beth Grant and K Callan), a kind woman who lives in Arizona. Hank is, at first, uncomfortable with his mother dating Gary Kasner (voiced by Carl Reiner), a Jewish man, but he warms up to Gary as their relationship progresses. Hank is dismayed by his mother's choice to break up with Gary to marry a man she has only known for a few weeks, Chuck Garrison, but eventually finds Chuck as likable as Gary. In contrast, Hank has a strained relationship with his father, Cotton Hill (voiced by Toby Huss), a cantankerous World War II veteran who lost his shins to machine gun fire in Japan and who verbally abused Tilly during their marriage, leading to their divorce. Cotton later marries Didi (voiced by Ashley Gardner), a candy striper who attended kindergarten with Hank. Together, Cotton and Didi have a son, "G.H." ("Good Hank"), who bears a striking resemblance to Bobby.

Other main characters include Hank's friends and their families. Dale Gribble (voiced by Johnny Hardwick) is the Hills' chain-smoking, balding, conspiracy-theorist next-door neighbor and Hank's best friend. As a result of his paranoia, Dale does not trust the government or "the system". He owns his own pest control business, Dale's Dead Bug, and is also a licensed bounty hunter and President of the Arlen Gun Club. Dale is married to Nancy Hicks-Gribble (voiced by Ashley Gardner), a weather reporter and later an anchorwoman for the Channel 84 news. Dale and Nancy's only child, Joseph (voiced by Brittany Murphy and later by Breckin Meyer), is best friends with Bobby Hill. He plays quarterback for the football team, enjoys destructive activities like setting ants on fire, and becomes somewhat girl-crazy as he gets older. Joseph is not biologically his son, but was instead born from Nancy's 14-year-long and still-ongoing affair with John Redcorn (voiced by Victor Aaron; later Jonathan Joss), a Native American healer who has given Nancy therapeutic massages for her headaches for years; their affair, and Joseph's real parentage, has long been common knowledge among Nancy's neighbors, who have all seemingly agreed to keep it a secret from Dale. Dale has expressed suspicion that he is not Joseph's biological father, but believes that Nancy was impregnated by aliens. Even so, he clearly loves his son.

Across the alley from the Hills lives Bill Dauterive (voiced by Stephen Root). Known as the "Billdozer" in his high school football glory days, Bill is now overweight, bald, and clinically depressed, still struggling to get over his divorce with his ex-wife Lenore. Bill is a Sergeant and barber in the United States Army who idolizes Hank. Bill's loneliness often results in him being easily taken advantage of by strangers until his friends come to his rescue. Throughout the series, he finds near-success with women, including former Texas Governor Ann Richards. He frequently expresses an unrequited attraction to Peggy, which she occasionally uses to her advantage.

Boomhauer (voiced by Mike Judge), who also lives in the Hill's neighborhood, is a slim womanizer whose fast, non-fluent, and jumbled speech can be hard to understand for the audience despite being easily understood by his friends and most other characters. He is shown to be able to sing clearly and speak fluent Spanish and French. During a perspective flashback in the Season 3 episode "A Fire Fighting We Will Go", Boomhauer sees himself speaking normally while everyone else speaks in Boomhauer's manner of speaking. Though his occupation is not explicitly stated, a single line early in the series indicates he is an electrician living on worker's comp. In a montage leading to the conclusion of the final episode, a Texas Ranger badge falls open on his dresser. His given name, Jeff, is not revealed until the 13th and final season.

In the series' first season, the Souphanousinphones, a Laotian family, move in next door to the Hills. The family consists of the materialistic Kahn (voiced by Toby Huss), his class-conscious wife Minh (voiced by Lauren Tom), and their teenage daughter, Kahn, Jr., who goes by the name "Connie" (voiced by Lauren Tom). Kahn—who fled poverty in Laos to become a successful businessman in America—is often at odds with his neighbors, believing them to be hillbillies and rednecks due to their lower socioeconomic status (despite evidence to the contrary). Minh often becomes involved in activities with Peggy and Nancy, whom she looks down on as uncivilized and ignorant, despite still considering them her best friends. Connie has been pushed by her father to become a child prodigy and excels at a variety of things from academics to music, though she rejects her father's materialism and judgmental nature. She develops a relationship with Bobby that blossoms into romance over the first half of the series before the two decide to remain friends. Connie often accompanies Bobby and Joseph on their adventures.

Other minor characters include Buck Strickland (voiced by Stephen Root), Hank's licentious boss at Strickland Propane; Joe Jack (voiced by Toby Huss) and Enrique (Danny Trejo), Hank's co-workers at Strickland; Carl Moss (voiced by Dennis Burkley), Bobby's principal at Tom Landry Middle School; and Reverend Karen Stroup (voiced by Mary Tyler Moore and later by Ashley Gardner), the female minister of Arlen First Methodist.

Following the show's slice of life format, which is consistently present throughout its run, the show presents itself as being more down-to-earth than other competing animated comedies, e.g. Family Guy, due to the way the show applies realism and often derives its plots and humor from mundane topics. Critics also note the great deal of humanity shown throughout the show.

History

Conception

In early 1995, during the successful first run of Beavis and Butt-Head on MTV, Mike Judge decided to create another animated series, this one set in a small Texas town based on an amalgamation of Dallas suburbs, including Garland, where he had lived, and Richardson. Judge conceived the idea for the show, drew the main characters, and wrote a pilot script.

The Fox Broadcasting Company was uncertain of the viability of Judge's concept for an animated comedy based in reality and set in the American South, so the network teamed the animator with Greg Daniels, an experienced prime-time TV writer who had previously worked on The Simpsons. Daniels rewrote the pilot script and created important characters who did not appear in Judge's first draft, including Luanne and Cotton. Daniels also reworked some of the supporting characters (whom the pair characterized as originally having been generic, "snaggle-toothed hillbillies"), such as making Dale Gribble a conspiracy theorist. While Judge's writing tended to emphasize political humor, specifically the clash of Hank Hill's social conservatism and interlopers' liberalism, Daniels focused on character development to provide an emotional context for the series' numerous cultural conflicts. Judge was ultimately so pleased with Daniels' contributions, he chose to credit him as a co-creator, rather than give him the "developer" credit usually reserved for individuals brought onto a pilot written by someone else.

Initial success
After its debut, the series became a large success for Fox and was named one of the best television series of the year by various publications, including Entertainment Weekly, Time, and TV Guide. For the 1997–1998 season, the series became one of Fox's highest-rated programs and even outperformed The Simpsons in the ratings that season, ranking 15th with an average of 16.3 million viewers per episode. During the fifth and sixth seasons, Mike Judge and Greg Daniels became less involved with the show. They eventually refocused on it, even while Daniels became increasingly involved with other projects.

Format change

Judge and Daniels' reduced involvement with the show resulted in the series' format turning more episodic and formulaic. Beginning in season seven, John Altschuler and Dave Krinsky, who had worked on the series since season two, took it over completely, tending to emphasize Judge's concept that the series was built around sociopolitical humor rather than character-driven humor. Although Fox insisted that the series lack character development or story arcs (a demand made of the network's other animated series, so that they can be shown out of order in syndication), Judge and Daniels had managed to develop minor arcs and story elements throughout the early years of the series, such as Luanne's becoming more independent and educated after Buckley's death, and the aging of characters being acknowledged (a rare narrative occurrence for an animated series). Lacking Judge and Daniels' supervision, the series ceased aging its characters and even began retconning character backstories; in the episode "A Rover Runs Through It", Peggy's mother was abruptly changed from a neurotic housewife with whom Peggy shared a competitive relationship to a bitter rancher from whom Peggy had been estranged for years. The format change also resulted in at least one minor character—Laoma, Kahn's mother—being written out of the show completely, and her relationship with Bill ignored in all future episodes.

Connection to Bless the Harts
Bless the Harts, an animated series created for Fox, loosely shares a universe with King of the Hill, and features the Mega-Lo-Mart in the show. Story editors Christy Stratton and Emily Spivey for King of the Hill are involved in the show, although Mike Judge is not. It premiered on September 29, 2019, and ended on June 20, 2021 due to Fox cancelling the series after two seasons.

Facing cancellation
Because it was scheduled to lead off Fox's Sunday-night animated programming lineup, portions of King of the Hill episodes were often pre-empted by sporting events that ran into overtime (the show was pre-empted more often than not by NFL football); in season nine especially, whole episodes were pre-empted. Ultimately, enough episodes were pre-empted that the majority of the series' 10th season—initially intended to be the final season, consisted of unaired ninth-season episodes. The 11th season was also meant to be the last, with a planned finale televised before it was renewed.

The 13th-season episode "Lucky See, Monkey Do" became the first episode of the series to be produced in widescreen high definition when it aired on February 8, 2009.

Cancellation
Although ratings remained consistent throughout the 10th, 11th, and 12th seasons and had begun to rise in the overall Nielsen ratings (up to the 105th most watched series on television, from 118th in season 8), Fox abruptly announced in 2008 that King of the Hill had been cancelled. The cancellation coincided with the announcement that Seth MacFarlane, creator of Family Guy and American Dad!, would be creating a Family Guy spin-off called The Cleveland Show, which would take over King of the Hill's time slot.

Hopes to keep the show afloat surfaced as sources indicated that ABC (which was already airing Judge's new animated comedy, The Goode Family) was interested in securing the rights to the show, but in January 2009, ABC president Steve McPherson said he had "no plans to pick up the animated comedy."

On April 30, 2009, it was announced that Fox ordered at least two more episodes to give the show a finale. The show's 14th season was originally supposed to air sometime in the 2009–2010 season, but Fox later announced that it would not air the episodes, opting instead for syndication. On August 10, 2009, however, Fox released a statement that the network would air a series finale on September 13, 2009.

During the panel discussion for the return of Beavis and Butt-Head at Comic-Con 2011, Mike Judge said that no current plans exist to revive King of the Hill, although he would not rule out the possibility of it returning.

Revival
In August 2017, it was revealed that Judge and Daniels had talked with Fox executives about a potential revival. In an interview with Rotten Tomatoes the following March, Judge said he would want the revived series to include aged characters, such as an older Bobby. In March 2020, Daniels revealed that he and Judge had an idea for the reboot. Daniels stated, "We do have a plan for it and it's pretty funny. So maybe one day." In March 2021, writer Brent Forrester stated that a reboot is currently underway, stating in a Tweet, "I am sure Greg Daniels and Mike Judge will murder me for sharing this but… HELL YES. They are in hot negotiations to bring back King of the Hill." The reboot will possibly feature "aged-up characters".

In January 2022, Judge and Daniels announced the forming of a new company called Bandera Entertainment, with a revival of King of the Hill being one of several series in development.

During a panel at Comic-Con 2022, Judge stated that the show "has a very good chance of coming back." In September 2022, Fox Entertainment president Michael Thorn confirmed that the series would not air on Fox, with the reason being that Fox prefers to have full ownership of whatever new shows they air.

On January 31, 2023, a revival on Hulu was officially confirmed to be ordered. Judge, Najimy, Root, Adlon, Hardwick and Tom are all expected to reprise their roles. With Murphy's death, it was not announced how the character of Luanne would be handled, and Toby Huss is not expected to return.

Setting and characters

Opening sequence
In the opening sequence, Hank joins Dale, Bill, and Boomhauer in the alley behind his house. When he opens his can of beer, the playback speed increases greatly and depicts other main and secondary characters carrying out various daily activities around them in a time-lapse. Meanwhile, the four continue drinking beer and a nearby recycling bin fills with their empty cans. When Peggy brings a bag of garbage out to Hank, the other three leave and the playback returns to normal speed as he takes it to the trash can and gathers with Peggy and Bobby.

The opening theme, "Yahoos and Triangles", is performed by the Arizona rock band The Refreshments. Variations of the theme are used for special episodes, including season finales and Christmas episodes.

Setting

King of the Hill is set in the fictional town of Arlen, Texas, an amalgamation of numerous Dallas-Fort Worth suburbs including Garland, Richardson, Arlington and Allen. In addition to drawing inspiration from the Dallas region, Judge has described Arlen as "a town like Humble" (a suburb of Houston). Time magazine praised the authentic portrayal as the "most acutely observed, realistic sitcom about regional American life bar none". In the episode "Hank's Cowboy Movie", the town's entrance sign lists its population as 145,300.

Though Arlen is inspired by various Texas suburban communities, its specific location in Texas is never specified in the series. 
Similar to the location of Springfield on The Simpsons, the location of Arlen within Texas is arbitrary based on the needs of a particular episode's plot, and multiple episodes give conflicting information as to Arlen's geographic location within the state. For example, one episode indicates that it is just north of the Brazos River in central Texas. Other episodes place it near Houston or Dallas, while others feature trips to Mexico and back taking place within a matter of hours. In the episode "Harlottown", the location is revealed to be somewhere on the Chisholm Trail.

The Hills and other major characters reside on the fictional Rainey Street in Arlen. Hank's friend and neighbor Bill Dauterive is a barber at Fort Blanda, an army post (similar to Fort Hood) near Arlen. Most of the children in the show attend the fictional Tom Landry Middle School. Early in the series, the school is referred to as being in the Heimlich County School District (according to markings on the school buses), though in later seasons this is changed to Arlen Independent School District. The school's mascot is a longhorn steer.

Characters

King of the Hill depicts an "average" family and their lives in a typical American town. It documents the Hills' day-to-day-lives in the small Texas town of Arlen, exploring themes such as parent-child relationships, friendship, loyalty, and justice.

Episodes

Reception

Critical response
King of the Hill received critical acclaim over its 13-year run. Early reviews of the show were positive. Diane Holloway at the Chicago Tribune considered it the "most Texan television series since Dallas", and praised the show's "sly sense of humor and subversive sensibility." At the Los Angeles Times, writer Howard Rosenberg suggested that the show "totes a few smiles, but [there's] little to bowl you over, and it takes a spell getting used to." The show's first season received an approval rating of 83% on review aggregator Rotten Tomatoes, based on sixteen reviews. Its consensus reads, "King of the Hill's mild yet extremely funny depiction of small-town Texas life is refreshingly worlds away from conventional prime-time animation." While the fifth and thirteenth seasons received more critical praise with a 100% approval rating.

At the show's conclusion, James Poniewozik at Time opined that it had "quietly been the best family comedy on TV", calling the show's ending "one of the most moving things I've seen on TV this year." Alan Sepinwall of The Star-Ledger described it as "sweeter and more human than the great majority of live-action sitcoms that overlapped its run." Genevieve Koski of The A.V. Club described the program as a "steadfast, down-to-earth series", while noting "the show saw its fair share of silly conceits and contrived setups—and got fairly repetitive in the final seasons."

Writers have examined the show through a political lens. "It's not a political show", said Mike Judge in 1997. "It's more a populist, common sense point of view." In 2005, Matt Bai of The New York Times Magazine called it "the most subtle and complex portrayal of small-town voters on television." A 2016 reappraisal from The Atlantic dubbed it the "last bipartisan TV comedy", with writer Bert Clere noting the program "imbued all of its characters with a rich humanity that made their foibles deeply sympathetic. In this, King of the Hill was far ahead of its time, and the broader TV landscape has yet to catch up."

As of 2014, King of the Hill was ranked No. 27 on IGN's "Top 100 Animated TV Series". In 2013, TV Guide ranked King of the Hill as one of the top 60 Greatest TV Cartoons of All Time.

Ratings

Awards and nominations

Home media

The first six seasons were released on DVD by 20th Century Fox Home Entertainment from 2003 to 2006. The seventh season was originally planned to be released in late 2006, but however, it was delayed, most likely due to poor sales of the DVDs, the release was cancelled. However, in 2014, Olive Films acquired the sub-license to release future seasons of the show, and seasons seven and eight were released on November 18, of that same year, with nine and ten released on April 7, 2015, eleven released on August 25, 2015, twelve released on September 22, 2015, and thirteen released (also Blu-ray) on October 20, 2015.

Netflix and Fox streamed all episodes, but stopped streaming on October 1, 2013, and in early 2017, the series was removed from iTunes and Google Play, though it returned to the latter later that year. As of May 2018, all episodes were again removed from Google Play and iTunes.

On November 1, 2018, all episodes became available for streaming on Hulu in the US. In some countries, the series was unavailable to stream or buy digitally, since Hulu is only available in the United States. However in 2022, the series was made available internationally on Disney+ through the Star hub.

The show aired in broadcast syndication from 2001 to 2020. From September 2004 to December 2008, FX aired the series daily nationwide. The show later aired on Cartoon Network's late-night programming block Adult Swim from January 1, 2009, to June 29, 2018. The series then aired short-lived reruns on Comedy Central and CMT from July 24, 2018, until November 2019, when the series was pulled from their lineups. However, the series joined FXX’s lineup on September 20, 2021; shortly thereafter, Adult Swim regained partial syndication, and so FXX and Adult Swim share the syndication rights as of November 22, 2021.

Video game
A video game based on the series was released on November 13, 2000, for the PC. The player goes on a hunting trip with Hank and the gang where the player must hunt for various animals. The game received mixed to negative reviews. The characters also appeared in a crossover game, Animation Throwdown: The Quest for Cards, which features not only King of the Hill, but also Family Guy, American Dad!, Futurama, Bob's Burgers, and (as of September 2022) Archer. They are also playable characters in a 2022 racing game, Warped Kart Racers, also featuring Family Guy and American Dad!, as well as Solar Opposites.

References

Archival sources 
  The King of the Hill Production Archive 1995–2006 (75 linear ft) is housed at the Wittliff Collections, Texas State University in San Marcos.

External links

 
 
 King of the Hill at the Big Cartoon DataBase
 King of the Hill on Comedy Central

 
1997 American television series debuts
2010 American television series endings
1990s American adult animated television series
2000s American adult animated television series
2010s American adult animated television series
1990s American sitcoms
2000s American sitcoms
2010s American sitcoms
1990s American comedy-drama television series
2000s American comedy-drama television series
2010s American comedy-drama television series
American adult animated comedy television series
American adult animated drama television series
American animated sitcoms
American television series revived after cancellation
Animated television series about children
Animated television series about families
English-language television shows
Fox Broadcasting Company original programming
Television series by Film Roman
Television series by 3 Arts Entertainment
Television series by 20th Century Fox Television
Television series by Fox Television Animation
Television series created by Greg Daniels
Television series created by Mike Judge
Texas culture
Television shows adapted into video games
Television shows set in Texas